Fremad ('Forward') was a Norwegian-language weekly newspaper published from Sioux Falls, South Dakota, United States, between 1894 and 1935. During its first two years of publishing, the socialist Olav Kringen edited the paper.

References

Norwegian-language newspapers published in the United States
Defunct newspapers published in South Dakota
Publications established in 1894
Publications disestablished in 1935
Defunct weekly newspapers